Mexico High School is a historic school building located in Mexico, Oswego County, New York. It is part of the Mexico Central School District. It was built in 1938 after a previous 1927 building was damaged by fire in 1937. It is a two-story, Georgian Revival style brick building in a U-shaped plan. It features a distinctive tower that contains an 1828 bell from an earlier building. The entry is distinguished by a two-story, five-bay portico supported by six Ionic columns and crowned by a Chippendale patterned balustrade.

It was listed on the National Register of Historic Places as the Mexico Academy and Central School in 1991.

References

External links
Mexico High School
Mexico Academy and Central School - Mexico, New York - U.S. National Register of Historic Places on Waymarking.com

Education in Oswego County, New York
School buildings on the National Register of Historic Places in New York (state)
Georgian Revival architecture in New York (state)
School buildings completed in 1938
National Register of Historic Places in Oswego County, New York